Mjóifjörður ("narrow fjord") is a village of 7 people in East Iceland, sitting on a fjord of the same name. It is part of the municipality of Fjarðabyggð.

History
In the early 20th century, the village was a Norwegian whaling station. The village also hosted the Dalatangi light. It is often referred as the smallest village in the country, and one of the most diverse.

Geography
The other villages composing the municipality are: Eskifjörður (1,068 inh.), Fáskrúðsfjörður (611 inh.), Neskaupstaður (1,400 inh.), Reyðarfjörður (2,238 inh.) and Stöðvarfjörður (231 inh.).

Sights 
Mjóafjarðarkirkja, a wooden church in the hamlet Brekka, was built in 1892 with about 100 seats and a ridge turret. The retable dates from 1871. The church was renovated in 1992. The church of Mjóifjörður was already mentioned in a document dating from 1092.

Infrastructure 
Mjóifjörður has a primary school, a camping site and a hotel with a café.

Climate

References

External links

 Mjóifjörður page on Fjarðabyggð municipal website

Populated places in Eastern Region (Iceland)
Fjords of Iceland
Whaling stations
Whaling in Iceland
Whaling in Norway